TRECE (formerly called 13TV) is a Spanish free-to-air television channel run by the Episcopal Conference of Spain, belongs to Radio Popular group together with the radio stations COPE, Rock FM, Cadena 100 and MegaStar FM and the TV network Popular TV.

History 
The channel was officially launched as 13TV on November 29, 2010 by renting a television frequency belonging to the group Unidad Editorial. On September 30, 2015, the channel received its own frequency, which began broadcasting officially in 2016.

Since its founding, the channel has shown its proximity to conservative postulates, something that intensified during the mandate of Antonio María Rouco Varela at the head of the Spanish Episcopal Conference, for which reason it was considered as a means of diffusion of the conservative wing of the People's Party.

In 2016 the Spanish Catholic Church commissioned a report on the situation of the channel due to the new social doctrine initiated by Pope Francis, the study showed that the channel had to undergo a reform because the public considered that the signal was aimed at a elderly audience and sympathizers of the People's Party. The new direction of the Episcopal Conference considered the reform of the contents of the channel was a necessary step for maintain the financing of 13TV.

In September 2017, the channel was subject to a change of identity, so it was renamed as Trece, in an attempt to improve the reputation of the signal and make it more plural, as it had been indicated to be very close to right-wing postulates. The channel's new programming was based on current affairs, religion and cinema, especially westerns, although some spaces from the previous stage of the channel were maintained because they generated good audience numbers. In addition, integration with COPE was increased.

Since 2017, the channel has been looking for a commercial partner to which it can assign part of its programming time in exchange for an improvement in economic income.

The channel had its best audience data during the spring and summer of 2020 due to the increase in film and religion programming derived from the lockdown decreed by the Spanish government to combat COVID-19. In May 2020, Trece was the most watched channel within the category of channels created for DTT.

Programming 
Channel programming is based on three main points: information; cinema  and current affairs about the Catholic Church and Pope Francis. These three fundamentals are transferred to a bar of programming integrated by programs of debate, analysis, news, interviews, documentaries and movies.

See also 
Catholic television
Catholic television channels
Catholic television networks

References

External links
 

Catholic television channels
Conservatism in Spain
Television stations in Spain
Television channels and stations established in 2010
Spanish-language television stations